

Gerard is a locality in the Australian state  of South Australia located in the Riverland on the northern side of the Murray River about  north-east of the state capital of Adelaide and about  northwest of Loxton.

Its boundaries were created on 12 August 1999.

As of 2012, the land use within Gerard is divided between conservation and agriculture with the former being concerned with the floodplain.  The title for land within Gerard held by the Aboriginal Lands Trust who has leased it to the Gerard Community Council.

Gerard is located within the federal division of Barker, the state electoral district of Chaffey and the Pastoral Unincorporated Area of South Australia.

See also
Gerard (disambiguation)

References

Towns in South Australia
Places in the unincorporated areas of South Australia
Riverland